The Balcerowicz Plan, also termed "Shock Therapy", was a method for rapidly transitioning from an economy based on state ownership and central planning, to a capitalist market economy. 
A group of experts, which they formed together with Balcerowicz, including Dr. Stanisław Gomułka, Dr. Stefan Kawalec and Dr. Wojciech Misiąg, in September 1989 created a reform plan based on an earlier idea of prof. Jeffrey Sachs, and on October 6, an outline of this plan was presented to the public by Balcerowicz at a press conference broadcast by TVP.

Named for Min. Balcerowicz, the Polish minister and economist Leszek Balcerowicz, the free-market economic reforms, the plan was adopted in Poland in 1989. There was a temporary drop in output, but growth was eventually achieved by 1992. Similar reforms were made in a number of countries. The plan has resulted in reduced inflation and budget deficit, while simultaneously increasing unemployment and worsening the financial situation of the poorest members of society.

Background 

The unofficial talks at Magdalenka and then the Polish Round Table talks of 1989 allowed for a peaceful transition of power to the democratically elected government. Initially it was agreed that the government would be formed by Tadeusz Mazowiecki and the opposition, while the seat of the president of Poland would be given to former Polish United Workers' Party leader Gen. Wojciech Jaruzelski.

The state of Poland's economy as of 1989 was dire. After failed social and economic reforms of 1970s the communist government had secretly declared its insolvency to Western creditors in 1981 Food price increases introduced first in 1970s to preserve the basic cash flow led to social unrest and formation of mass Solidarity social change movement which, by early 1980s had over 10 million members. Desperate attempts  to maintain the Marxian-style economy and internal opposition in the Party to any economic reforms that would break this status quo led to introduction of martial law (1981-83) which further hindered economic growth and resulted in international sanctions. In 1982 the government imposed further large (up to 100%) price increases  and significantly extended rationing of food and other basic goods.

In late 1980s, after 45 years of communist rule, Poland's economy was ineffective, paralyzed by central planning and discontent of poorly paid workers. The inflation rate had reached 639.6% and was constantly rising. Foreign debt reached $42 billion. The majority of state-owned monopolies and holdings were largely ineffective and completely obsolete in terms of technology. Although there was practically no unemployment in Poland, wages were low and the shortage economy led to lack of even the most basic foodstuffs in the shops.

The plan 
In September 1989 a commission of experts was formed under the presidency of Leszek Balcerowicz, Poland's leading economist, Minister of Finance and deputy Premier of Poland. Among the members of the commission were Jeffrey Sachs, Stanisław Gomułka, Stefan Kawalec and Wojciech Misiąg. The commission prepared a plan of extensive reforms that were to enable fast transformation of Poland's economy from "obsolete and ineffective central planning" to capitalism, as adopted by the states of Western Europe and America. 

On 6 October the program was presented on public television and in December the Sejm passed a packet of 10 acts, all of which were signed by the president on 31 December 1989. These were:

 Act on Financial Economy Within State-owned Companies, which allowed for state-owned businesses to declare bankruptcy and ended the fiction by which companies were able to exist even if their effectiveness and accountability was close to none. Removed the guarantee of the existence of all state-owned enterprises regardless of their financial results and production efficiency, enabled the insolvency proceedings against unprofitable enterprises.
 Act on Banking Law, which forbade financing the state budget deficit by the national central bank and forbade the issue of new currency.
 Act on Credits, which abolished the preferential laws on credits for state-owned companies and tied interest rates to inflation.
 Act on Taxation of Excessive Wage Rise, introducing the so-called popiwek tax limiting the wage increase in state-owned companies in order to limit hyperinflation.
 Act on New Rules of Taxation, introducing common taxation for all companies and abolishing special taxes that could previously have been applied to private companies through means of administrative decision.
 Act on Economic Activity of Foreign Investors, allowing foreign companies and private people to invest in Poland and export their profits abroad, exempting enterprises with foreign capital from paying popiwek tax.
 Act on Foreign Currencies, introducing internal exchangeability of the złoty and abolishing the state monopoly in international trade.
 Act on Customs Law, creating a uniform customs rate for all companies.
 Act on Employment, regulating the duties of unemployment agencies. Formally sanctioning the existence of unemployment.
 Act on Special Circumstances Under Which a Worker Could be Laid Off, protecting the workers of state firms from being fired in large numbers and guaranteeing unemployment grants and severance pay.

In late December the plan was approved by the International Monetary Fund. The IMF's support was especially important because the national debt in various foreign banks and governments reached an amount of US$42.3 billion (64,8% of GDP) in 1989. The IMF granted Poland with a stabilization fund of US$1 billion and an additional stand-by credit of US$720 million. Following this the World Bank granted Poland additional credits for modernization of exports of Polish goods and food products. Many governments followed and paid off some of the former Communist debt (about 50% of the sum of debt capital and all cumulated interest rates to 2001).

Effects 

The most visible change in 1989 was the end of food and basic goods shortages thanks to depenalization of private trade, which was a criminal offense ("speculation") before 1989. Formally the law was enacted on 1 December 1989 but since enforcement was stopped by summer 1989, shops were inundated by goods produced and imported by small private enterprises. The Christmas of 1989, which is in Poland celebrated with a lot of traditional dishes, was the first one when people could buy goods without queues, corruption or black market. Previously scarce goods, especially food, toys and electronics, were now widely available from private suppliers, although at significantly higher prices.

In the larger picture, the reforms drastically limited the state's influence over the economy. The plan released price-fixing for many products, allowing them to be decided by the market instead of the Central Statistical Office. Also, the internal debt was drastically limited by 3% of GNP by reducing state subsidies to coal, electricity and petroleum. Although inflation seemed to be out of control, the Polish economy gradually started to get back on track. By 1992, more than 600,000 private companies had been set up, providing jobs for approximately 1.5 million people. 

Poland's annual growth rate between 1989 and 2000 was the highest of all post-communist economies. Economists in Ukraine frequently use the Balcerowicz Plan as a comparison of how economy could grow in Ukraine if similar reforms had been implemented in 1990 or, from the opposite point of view, how it could have stagnated in Poland if the plan were not implemented. In terms of GDP per capita corrected by purchasing power parity, both countries started from the same level in 1990, but Ukraine's economy was developing much slower in subsequent years.

Many aspects of the post-communist economy were shock to the society, for example sharp rise of prices on food that was previously officially sold at small, regulated prices even though it was in fact rarely seen in shops.  Many state-owned enterprises and collective farms were already insolvent in 80's and didn't pay their workers for months or years (which was the cause for unrest) but from legal point of view they weren't bankrupt, since the concept of bankruptsy of a state-owned enterprise did not even exist in the communist legislation for ideological reasons, just as didn't unemployment.

Balcerowicz reforms reintroduced these concepts to the Polish law to allow for restructurization and privatization, which resulted in a widespread perception that it was these reforms that were the direct cause for bankruptcy and unemployment. The rise of formal unemployment was especially drastic in rural areas of the country, which had previously been collectivized by the government into state-owned farms.

A number of left-wing and populist leaders criticized the reforms - most notably, Andrzej Lepper, the leader of the populist Self-Defense (Samoobrona) party, used the slogan "Balcerowicz must go" (Balcerowicz musi odejść). 

Dynamics of GDP (according to PPP in USD) in selected countries  - "GGDC"

Inflation at the end of year in selected countries

Dynamics of employees number in selected countries - "GGDC"

Unemployment rate in selected countries

See also
 Revolutions of 1989
 Deindustrialisation of Poland
 Structural adjustment
 Washington Consensus

References

External links
 Privatization Barometer (Poland), the official provider of privatization data to OECD and the World Bank
 Poland's Protracted Transition: Institutional Change and Economic Growth, 1970–1994 (Series: Cambridge Russian, Soviet and Post-Soviet Studies) by Kazimierz Z. Poznanski (University of Washington)
 From Solidarity to Sellout: The Restoration of Capitalism in Poland by Tadeusz Kowalik
 Underwriting Democracy by George Soros
 "SOCJALIZM. KAPITALIZM. TRANSFORMACJA Szkice z przełomu epok" by Leszek Balcerowicz

History of Poland (1989–present)
Economic history of Poland
Privatization in Poland
Economic liberalization
Reform in Poland